Michael John Turner CBE (born 5 August 1948) is the former chief executive officer (CEO) of the aerospace and defence company BAE Systems, and current chairman of Babcock International and prior to the hostile takeover by Melrose was chairman of GKN plc.

Early life
He attended Didsbury Technical High School (became Wilbraham High School in 1965) on School Lane in Didsbury. He gained a BA from Manchester Polytechnic in 1970, whilst working for Hawker Siddeley Aviation which he joined in 1966.

Career
Turner replaced the previous CEO at BAE Systems plc, John Weston, in March 2002 who was dismissed. Turner has previously been a Chief Operating Officer (COO) of the company, responsible for all of the company's business units.

Both Turner and BAE's previous chairman, Sir Richard Evans, have had an abrasive relationship with senior Ministry of Defence officials. BAE took a £750 million hit against these projects.

On 15 October 2007 it was announced by BAE Systems that Turner would step down from his role in 2008. On 1 September 2008 Ian King the COO took over from Turner as CEO.

Turner is a member of the Apprenticeship Ambassadors Network and was awarded the prestigious "Honorary Apprenticeship Award" in July 2009.

Career timeline
1966 – Undergraduate Commercial Apprentice, Hawker Siddeley Aviation.
1970 – Contracts Officer, Hawker Siddeley Aviation.
1978 – Contracts Manager (Military), British Aerospace Aircraft Group Manchester Division.
1981 – Executive Director - Administration, British Aerospace
1982 – Divisional Administration Director, British Aerospace
Early 1980s to 1984 – Advanced Turboprop (ATP) Project team leader, British Aerospace
1984 – Divisional Director and General Manager, Kingston, British Aerospace. Responsible for BAE's Kingston and Dunsfold Park facilities, which manufactured the Harrier and Hawk aircraft respectively.
1986 – Director and General Manager, Weybridge, Kingston and Dunsfold, part of BAe's Military Aircraft Division.
1987 – Director Marketing and Product Support, BAe Military Aircraft Division.
1988 – Executive Vice President Defence Marketing, British Aerospace
1992 – Chairman and Managing Director, British Aerospace Regional Aircraft and Chairman of Jetstream Aircraft.
1994 – Promoted to the British Aerospace board as of 1 January
1994 – Chairman of Commercial Aerospace, which included BAE's Airbus factories.
1995 – Vice-President of the Society of British Aerospace Companies until 1996, then President from June 1996 until June 1997.
1996 – Non-Executive Director of Babcock International Group.
1996 – Head of BAE's defence export businesses
1998 – Appointed to the Airbus Supervisory Board. Retained this seat with the formation of Airbus SAS in 2001 until BAE sold its 20% share in 2006.
1999 – With the formation of BAE Systems, became Chief Operating Officer.
2002 – Replaced John Weston as CEO.
2005 – Non-Executive Director of P&O. Stepped down in March 2006.
2006 – Executive Directorship at Lazard Ltd
2008 – Non-Executive Chairman of Babcock International Group.
2012 – Non-Executive Chairman of GKN Plc
2018- Non-Executive Barclays PLC

Recognition
He received a CBE for services to the Aerospace Industry in the Queen's 1999 Birthday Honours. 2014 NED FTSE 100 Chairman of the year

Personal life
In 1972, he married Rosalind Thomas and they have two sons.

See also
The Superclass List

References

External links
BAE SYSTEMS: Biography
 Loughborough University honorary degree in 2007
Cranfield Honorary doctorate
Manchester Metropolitan Honorary doctorate

1948 births
Living people
British chief executives
BAE Systems people
Commanders of the Order of the British Empire
People from Didsbury
Alumni of Manchester Metropolitan University
American chief operating officers